This is a list of the most expensive Czech films, with budgets given in Czech korunas.

Most expensive Czech films

Record-holders

See also
 List of most expensive films
 List of most expensive non-English-language films
 List of highest-grossing films
 List of highest-grossing Czech films

Notes

References

Expensive
Czech